The role of Detroit, Michigan, and in literature has been significantly discussed, including in academic works. . 
The city and its suburbs, is the setting for a number of novels and short story collections,    including:
 Louis-Ferdinand Céline, Voyage au bout de la nuit, 1932 (Journey to the End of the Night, 1934)
 Harriette Arnow,  The Dollmaker  1954
  Rainelle Burton, The Root Worker, 2001
 Jim Daniels, Detroit Tales  2003
 Jeffrey Eugenides, The Virgin Suicides  1993 and Middlesex 2002
 Arthur Hailey, Wheels 1971
 Gary Hardwick, The Executioner's Game 2005
 William X. Kienzle, The Rosary Murders  1979
 Elmore Leonard, City Primeval: Detroit at High Noon  1980
 Joyce Carol Oates, them  1968
 Harold Robbins, The Betsy  1971
 James O'Barr, The Crow  1981
 Marge Piercy, "Braided Lives"
 Patrick O'Leary, Door Number Three 1995
 Jeffry Scott Hansen  Warpath  2003
 Paul Clemens, Made in Detroit  2005
 Alexander C. Irvine, The Narrows 2005
 Joe Borri, Eight Dogs Named Jack  2007
 Frank Anthony Polito, Band Fags!  2008
 Michael Zadoorian, Second Hand 2000, The Lost Tiki Palaces of Detroit 2009, Beautiful Music 2018 and The Narcissism of Small Differences 2020

References

Culture of Detroit